The Man Upstairs is a 1958 British psychological drama film directed by Don Chaffey. It stars Richard Attenborough and Bernard Lee. The film was produced by Robert Dunbar for Act Films Ltd.

Plot
Peter Watson, a tenant of a boarding house, is troubled with pain and an inability to sleep. He repeatedly tries unsuccessfully to light the gas-fire that requires coins and seeks help from another lodger, artist Nicholas, who is spending the night with his model, and is reluctant to be disturbed. Another neighbour, Pollen, calls for police help. The other occupants in the property are awake by this time, and one of them, Mrs Barnes, tries to help the mentally confused Watson (known to them as John Wilson) but he also refuses her help. The police clash with Mr Sanderson, a mental health worker, who thinks he can take Watson, who is armed, without complications, but when a police sergeant is injured Inspector Thompson is determined to remove him by force if necessary. Eventually Mrs Barnes manages to persuade the sick man to leave his room, and Mr Sanderson accompanies him to a waiting ambulance for hospital treatment.

Cast
 Richard Attenborough as Peter Watson
 Bernard Lee as Inspector Thompson
 Donald Houston as Mr. Sanderson
 Dorothy Alison as Mrs. Barnes
 Patricia Jessel as Mrs. Lawrence
 Virginia Maskell as Helen Grey 
 Kenneth Griffith as Pollen 
 Alfred Burke as Mr. Barnes 
 Charles Houston as Nicholas 
 Maureen Connell as Eunice Blair 
 Amy Dalby as Miss Acres
 Walter Hudd as Superintendent
 Patrick Jordan as	Injured Sergeant
 Graham Stewart as Sergeant Morris
 Victor Brooks as Sergeant Collins
 Edward Judd as P.C. Stevens

Critical reception
TV Guide wrote, "a superb performance from Attenborough is at the core of this character study"; and The New York Times singled out Alun Falconer's "script, the tight direction by Don Chaffey, and the performances of the principals", and noted, "although they (the performances) do not make "The Man Upstairs" extraordinary, they give this modest effort the sheen of honesty and quality."

References

External links

1958 films
British drama films
Films directed by Don Chaffey
1950s English-language films
1950s British films